David Gallagher (born 7 March 1980) is an Irish sportsperson who currently plays Gaelic football for Meath Senior Football Championship club St Peters Dunboyne and was a member of the senior Meath county squad from 1999 to 2005 but returned in 2009 following the brief retirement of Brendan Murphy but was forced to retire due to injuries. In October 2011 it was announced that Gallagher would seeking return to Goalkeeping following speculations that Murphy was considering retirement. Two months later Gallagher was recalled to the Meath after the second retirement of Brendan Murphy
In November 2012 Gallagher confirms his second retirement from Inter County football.

He was selected as part of the Ireland squad for the 2008 International Rules Series, despite not then playing inter-county football, a decision which led to criticism of manager Seán Boylan.

Honours
 Leinster Senior Football Championship (1): 2001
 Leinster Under-21 Football Championship (1): 2001

References

1980 births
Living people
Gaelic football goalkeepers
Irish international rules football players
Meath inter-county Gaelic footballers
St Peter's Dunboyne Gaelic footballers